Katharine Barker (born 10 March 1941 in Sedbergh, Yorkshire) is an English actress. She played Dolly Skilbeck in Emmerdale Farm from 1977 until 1979, when Jean Rogers took over the role. She also had a starring role in Hay Fever by the Oxford Stage Company.

Personal life
Katharine Barker was married to Michael Pennington from October 1964 until 1967, and they had one child.

References

Living people
1941 births
British stage actresses
Actresses from Yorkshire
People from Sedbergh